Sensbachtal is a village and a former municipality in the Odenwaldkreis (district) in Hesse, Germany. Since January 2018, it is part of the new town Oberzent.

Geography

Location
Sensbachtal lies in the southern Odenwald and the Geo-Naturpark Bergstraße-Odenwald at elevations of between 300 and 550 m, 10 km away from Eberbach on the Neckar.

Neighbouring communities
Sensbachtal borders in the east on the community of Hesseneck (Odenwaldkreis), in the south on the town of Eberbach (Rhein-Neckar-Kreis in Baden-Württemberg) and in the west and north on the town of Beerfelden (Odenwaldkreis).

Constituent communities
Sensbachtal’s Ortsteile are Hebstahl, Ober-Sensbach and Unter-Sensbach.

Politics
The municipal election held on 26 March 2006 yielded the following results:

The municipal council is thereby made up exclusively of non-party voter communities. In Hesse, this is otherwise only the case in the community of Antrifttal (Vogelsbergkreis).

Mayor
Egon Scheuermann has been the mayor since 1 January 2008.

Culture and sightseeing

Buildings
The Jagdschloss Krähberg (“hunting palace”) was built about 1780, and is nowadays privately used.

Economy and infrastructure

Transport
Bundesstraße 45 lies roughly 8 km from the community.

References

External links
 

Odenwaldkreis
Former municipalities in Hesse